Bandō Mitsugorō X (January 23, 1956 – February 2, 2015) was a Japanese television presenter and kabuki actor. He was the grandson of Bandō Mitsugorō VIII and son of Bandō Mitsugorō IX.

Filmography

Films
Mishima: A Life in Four Chapters (1985) – Mizoguchi
Rikyu (1989) – Ishida Mitsunari
Sharaku (1995) – Matsudaira Sadanobu
Like Asura (2003) – Sadaharu Masukawa 
Love and Honor (2006) – Tōya Shimada
Kabei: Our Mother (2008) – Shigeru Nogami
The Lightning Tree (2010) – Tokugawa Ienari
Isoroku (2011) – Teikichi Hori

Television
NHK Taiga drama series
Katsu Kaishū (1974) – Tokugawa Iemochi
Takeda Shingen (1988) – Suwa Yorishige
Tokugawa Yoshinobu (1999) – Katsu Kaishū
Kōmyō ga Tsuji (2006) – Akechi Mitsuhide
On'yado Kawasemi (1981) – Masakichi
Onihei Hankachō (1989) – Matsugorō and Heikichi
Furuhata Ninzaburō (1994) – Yonezawa 8-dan

References

External links
 Official site 
 Bandō Mitsugorō X - Kabuki on the web 

1956 births
2015 deaths
People from Tokyo
Japanese television presenters
Japanese male actors
Kabuki actors
Male actors from Tokyo